Kingsman: The Golden Circle is the soundtrack to the 2017 film of the same name, composed by Henry Jackman and Matthew Margeson. The score was recorded at AIR Lyndhurst Studios in London with additional mixing at Westside Pacific Studios. The score was conducted by Gavin Greenaway with Matt Dunkley as an additional conductor. It was released on iTunes on 22 September 2017 and on CD on 27 October 2017 by La-La Land Records and Fox Music.

Track listing

Tracks 1, 20, and 23 incorporate "Take Me Home, Country Roads" (B. Danoff/T. Nivert/J. Denver).Track 20 features vocals by Mark Strong.

Songs not included in the soundtrack, but featured in the film include the following:

 Prince and The Revolution - "Let's Go Crazy"
 Harold Melvin & the Blue Notes - "Don't Leave Me This Way"
 Buddy Holly - "Raining in My Heart"
 Embrace - "Ashes"
 Tom Chaplin - "Quicksand"
 John Denver - "Annie's Song"
 Henry Jackman - "Rage and Serenity" (from X-Men: First Class)
 Elton John - "Daniel"
 Elton John - "Saturday Night's Alright for Fighting"
 Elton John - "Rocket Man (I Think It's Going to Be a Long, Long Time)"
 The BossHoss - "Word Up!"
 Cameo - "Word Up!"
 Elton John - "Jack Rabbit"

References

2017 soundtrack albums
Film scores
La-La Land Records soundtracks
Kingsman (franchise)
Henry Jackman soundtracks